Saint Vimin (or Gwynnin, Vimianus, Viminus, Vimmin, Vinim, Vivian, Wynnia, Wynnin; died 579) was a Scottish abbot and bishop.
He is said to have founded Holywood Abbey in Fife, Scotland.
However, there are no reliable sources for his life.
His feast day is 21 January.

Name and heritage

The parish of Kirkgunzeon in southwest Scotland was called Kirkwynnin in 1200.
William J. Watson (1865–1948) states that the name appears to combine kirk (church) with the Welsh form of Finnén, an affectionate name for Findbarr of Moyville, also called Findia.
Findbarr's death was recorded in 579 as "quies Uinniani episcopi" (Bishop Uinniani died).
The nearby Kylliemingan probably is  Cill m'Fhinnéin, meaning "my Finnén's church."

Monks of Ramsgate accounts

The monks of St Augustine's Abbey, Ramsgate wrote in their Book of Saints (1921),

Butler's account

The hagiographer Alban Butler (1710–1773) wrote in his Lives of the Fathers, Martyrs, and Other Principal Saints under January 21,

Notes

Citations

Sources

 

 

Medieval Scottish saints
579 deaths